Estonian Sports Association Jõud is an Estonian sports association.

Since 2011 the president of Jõud is Helir-Valdor Seeder.

History
Names:
 1946–1951 Eesti NSV Vabatahtlik Spordiühing Jõud
 1951–1956 Eesti NSV Vabatahtlik Spordiühing Kolhoosnik
 1957–1987 Eesti NSV Vabatahtlik Spordiühing Jõud
 1990–2007 Eesti Maaspordi Liit Jõud

Notable sportsmen:
 Jaan Talts, Estonian weightlifter, olympic winner
 Jaak Uudmäe, Estonian triple jumper, olympic winner
 Enn Sellik, Estonian runner
 Toomas Napa, Estonian racing driver

References

External links
 

Sports organizations of Estonia